Stara Wieś  is a large village in the administrative district of Gmina Brzozów, within Brzozów County, Subcarpathian Voivodeship, in south-eastern Poland. The village has a population of 3,500.

History
The land which Stara Wieś and its immediate neighbour, Brzozów occupy today, in the early 14th century was covered in birch forest, hence the name Brzozów, derived from Brzoza, meaning birch tree. On October 2, 1359, King Casimir the Great at Kraków granted Stefan Wojosta, a royal knight, the privilege of establishing a village in a forest named Brzozowe. That name was adopted for Wojosta's settlement. Later related names appeared in documents: Bresen (1384), Brzozowo (1403), Brzozowa (1437). In the late 14th century, another settlement was built above the original village to escape the regular river floods and for better defences. In 1460 this second settlement took on the name of Brzozów while the original settlement became known as Stara Wieś meaning the "Old Village". 

The King's original grant consisted of 50 franconian łans (about 3000 acres) distributed as follows—3 lans for the village elder, 2 lans for maintenance of the church, two common lans for grazing - and the remaining 43 lans for settlers with one lan each as set out according to the Magdeburg rights. A church building was funded as part of the settlement. The first church, dedicated as Corpus Christi, was built between 1359 and 1375. A second church, dedicated as the Birth of Our Holy Lady, was built in 1698 replacing the three century old wooden structure. It contained three altars. In 1730 with the arrival of the Pauline Fathers construction commenced on the present brick church, the Basilica of the Assumption of the Most Holy Virgin.

After the Partitions of Poland, Stara Wieś fell to the Kingdom of Galicia and Lodomeria in the Habsburg empire. There was a convent of the Sisters Servants of the Immaculate Conception of Mary while the Pauline Fathers ceded their monastery to the Society of Jesus in the second half of the 19th century. The Jesuits founded their college and Novitiate in the monastic buildings and have remained there since.

People associated with the village

 Stanisław Dydek, born in the village and author of a monograph about it
 Józef Bielawski, arabist
 Stanisław Boroń, headmaster murdered in Majdanek concentration camp
 Franciszek Boroń, educationalist
 Tadeusz Boroń, World War II veteran, who died in Luton, Bedfordshire in 2011 aged 96
 Leonia Nastał, a nun
 Paweł Siwek SJ
 Feliks Riedl SJ 
 Jan Beyzym SJ
 Adam Kozłowiecki SJ, Cardinal  
 Włodzimierz Ledóchowski SJ, General of the Society of Jesus 
 Wojciech Baudiss SJ 
 Adam Chmielowski, Franciscan friar
 Blessed Katarzyna Celestyna Faron, a nun murdered in Auschwitz concentration camp
 Adam Sudoł, priest
 Stanisław Sarnowski, bishop
 Stanisław Ścibor-Bogusławski, priest

References

Villages in Brzozów County